Gavin Woods (born 1948) is a South African former politician.

References

External links
Interview with Gavin Woods PDF
 Nadeco gets first MPs, IFP loses five 9/7/2005
 Public sector corruption : behavioural origins and counter-behavioural responses

1947 births
Living people
People from Durban
Inkatha Freedom Party politicians
Members of the National Assembly of South Africa
South African people of British descent